The Karelian National Movement (Russian: Карельское Национальное Движение; Karelian and Finnish: Karjalan kansallisliike) or KNM is a far-right and ethnocentric Karelian separatist organization founded in 2014 under the name Stop the Occupation of Karelia by a political émigré Dmitry Kuznetsov, who also goes by the name Miteri Panfilov. As of January 2023, the Karelian National Movement has 25 members who actively work there.

History
The KNM was founded in 2014 under the name Stop the Occupation of Karelia as an online forum that advocated for the full independence of Karelia. The website was banned by Roskomnadzor in 2015. In 2016 Dmitry Kuznetsov gained political asylum in Spain after being prosecuted in Russia for separatism. At the point of prosecution, he had already been living in Spain for more than 2 years. The leader of the Karelian Republican Movement, Vadim Shtepa, refused to cooperate with the KNM, citing their ethnocentrism as the reason. He also stated that the Karelian National Movement has no future due to their extreme nationalism and complete misunderstanding of the current situation in the Republic of Karelia. The movement became active again after the Russian invasion of Ukraine and became part of the Free Nations of Post-Russia Forum. New members joined the organization after the invasion, such as Vladislav Oleynik, the administrator of a far-right online group called "Væringjavegr ᛝ Fennoscandia". He became the head of international relations of the organization.The KNM is in conflict with the Finnish Karjalan Liitto organization, which represents Karelian evacuees in Finland, due to their refusal to cooperate with the KNM to "return” Karelia. Kuznetsov later claimed that the Finnish organization is supported by the FSB.
The KNM refuses to cooperate with other separatist movements in Karelia. They criticized the use of guerrilla warfare and called partisan movements, such as the Green Gendarme, a trap by the FSB, but those claims were later deleted from their Telegram channel.

In 2023 the Karelian National Movement organized a volunteer battalion that became a part of the International Legion of Territorial Defence of Ukraine.

Goals
The Karelian National Movement seeks the creation of an independent Karelian state for Karelians, Finns, Ingrian Finns, Vepsians, Pomors and Kola Norwegians based on traditional Nordic values. The movement opposes Russians involving themselves in Karelian separatism and considers them colonizers and occupants. The movement also uses Neo-Nazi imagery, such as the Wolfsangel and justifies the policies of Finland during the occupation of Eastern Karelia.

The KNM also claims territories lost by Finland after the Winter War, including the city of Vyborg.  Their claims also include Kandalaksha, the southeast of the Kola peninsula and the towns of Onega, Tikhvin and Vytegra, which were once part of the Olonets Governorate.

See also 

 Karelian National Battalion - a voluntary military unit consisting of ethnic Karelians, including members of the KNM
 Republican Movement of Karelia - another Karelian regionalist and separatist organization
 Separatism in Russia

References 

Separatism
Separatism in Russia
Nationalism in Russia
Karelia
Republic of Karelia
Resistance during the 2022 Russian invasion of Ukraine